Herpolasia is a genus of moths of the Zygaenidae family.

Species
 Herpolasia augarra Rothschild & Jordan, 1905

References
 Herpolasia at funet.fi

Chalcosiinae
Zygaenidae genera